The Qeysarie gate is a historical gate in the main entrance of the Bazaar of Isfahan and Qeysarie Bazaar in Isfahan, Iran. The gate had had originally 3 floors, but the third floor was destroyed later. The destroyed third floor had been a Naqqarekhane. The gate was built in the 17th century during the Safavid era.

History
It may be named after Alexandria.

Gallery

See also 
List of the historical structures in the Isfahan province

References 

17th-century mosques
Architecture in Iran
Gates